Ivan Lebedeff (born Ivan Vasilyevich Lebedev, 18 June 1894 – 31 March 1953) was a Russian film actor, lecturer and writer. He appeared in 66 films between 1926 and 1953. In 1940, his novel, Legion of Dishonor, was published.

Biography
Lebedeff was born in Ushpol, now Užpaliai, then part of the Russian Empire, now Lithuania, on 18 June 1894. He migrated to the United States in 1925 and in 1930 was recorded at Los Angeles as an actor.

On 15 August 1937, he was recorded as re-entering the United States from Mexico, when it was noted that he had resided in the U. S. between 2 October 1925 and 14 October 1930, and again between 20 April 1932, and 13 August 1937. His closest relation was given as his sister Nathalie Lebedeff, of Nice, in the south of France.

On 12 November 1937, he was naturalized in the U.S. District Court for the Southern District of California. In 1944, he campaigned on behalf of Governor Thomas Dewey, Republican presidential candidate.

He died on 31 March 1953, in Los Angeles, California, from a heart attack.

Partial filmography

 Fine Manners (1926) - The Prince (uncredited)
 The Sorrows of Satan (1926) - Amiel
 The Love of Sunya (1927) - Ted Morgan
 The Angel of Broadway (1927) - Lonnie
 The Forbidden Woman (1927) - Sheik
 Let 'Her Go Gallagher (1928) - Stephen B. Hade AKA Four Fingers Dan
 Walking Back (1928) - Beaut Thibaut
 Sin Town (1929) - Pete Laguerro
 The Veiled Woman (1929) - Capt. Paul Fevier
 The One Woman Idea (1929) - Hosainn
 Street Girl (1929) - Prince Nicholaus of Aregon
 They Had to See Paris (1929) - Marquis de Brissac
 Men Without Women (1930) - Man in Bar with Top Hat (uncredited)
 The Cuckoos (1930) - Baron de Camp
 Midnight Mystery (1930) - Mischa Kawelin
 Conspiracy (1930) - Butch Miller
 The Lady Refuses (1931) - Nikolai Rabinoff
 Laugh and Get Rich (1931) - Count Dimitriff (uncredited)
 Bachelor Apartment (1931) - Pedro De Maneau
 The Gay Diplomat (1931) - Captain Ivan Orloff
 Unholy Love (1932) - Alex Stockmar
 Sweepings (1933) - Prince Niko Gilitziv (uncredited)
 Made on Broadway (1933) - Ramon Salinas
 Laughing at Life (1933) - Don Flavio Montenegro
 Bombshell (1933) - Marquis
 Moulin Rouge (1934) - Ramon
 The Merry Frinks (1934) - Ramon Alvarez
 Kansas City Princess (1934) - Dr. Sascha Pilnakoff
 Strange Wives (1934) - Dimitri
 Sweepstake Annie (1935) - Baron Rudolph Baritska
 Goin' to Town (1935) - Ivan Valadov
 China Seas (1935) - Ngah
 She Couldn't Take It (1935) - Count (uncredited)
 The Golden Arrow (1936) - Count Guilliano
 Pepper (1936) - Baron Von Stofel
 Love on the Run (1936) - Igor
 Mama Steps Out (1937) - Coco Duval - the Painter
 Fair Warning (1937) - Count Andre Lukacha
 History Is Made at Night (1937) - Michael Browsky
 Maytime (1937) - Empress' Dinner Companion (uncredited)
 Atlantic Flight (1937) - Baron Hayygard
 Angel (1937) - Prince Vladimir Gregorovitch (scenes deleted)
 Conquest (1937) - Cossack Captain (uncredited)
 Wise Girl (1937) - Prince Michael
 Straight Place and Show (1938) - Ivan Borokov - Russian Jockey
 You Can't Cheat an Honest Man (1939) - Ronnie (uncredited)
 The Mystery of Mr. Wong (1939) - Michael Strogonoff
 Trapped in the Sky (1939) - Dure
 Hotel for Women (1939) - Galdos (uncredited)
 Passport to Alcatraz (1940) - Bogen
 Public Deb No. 1 (1940) - Feodor
 The Shanghai Gesture (1941) - The Gambler
 Blue, White and Perfect (1942) - Alexis Fournier
 Lure of the Islands (1942) - The Commandant
 Foreign Agent (1942) - Okura
 Journey into Fear (1943) - Witness (uncredited)
 Mission to Moscow (1943) - Mr. Rosengoltz (uncredited)
 Around the World (1943) - Menlo (uncredited)
 Are These Our Parents? (1944) - Alexis Dolan
 Oh, What a Night (1944) - Boris
 Rhapsody in Blue (1945) - Nightclub Guest (uncredited)
 Heartbeat (1946) - Thief at Ball (uncredited)
 California Conquest (1952) - Alexander Rotcheff
 The Snows of Kilimanjaro (1952) - Marquis (uncredited)
 The War of the Worlds (1953) - Dr. Gratzman (uncredited)

References

External links

 Сотрудники РНБ — Лебедев Иван Васильевич

1894 births
1953 deaths
People from Utena District Municipality
People from Kovno Governorate
Russian male silent film actors
Soviet male silent film actors
Soviet emigrants to the United States
20th-century Russian male actors
Soviet male actors
American people of Russian descent
Burials at Forest Lawn Memorial Park (Glendale)